Thijs Oosting (born 2 May 2000) is a Dutch football player. He plays for Eredivisie side Willem II.

Club career
He made his Eerste Divisie debut for Jong AZ on 17 November 2018 in a game against Jong PSV as a 77th-minute substitute for Mees Kaandorp and scored his first professional goal 10 minutes later in an eventual 1–3 loss. He made his Eredivisie debut for the senior squad of AZ on 14 August 2021 against Waalwijk. He scored his first goal on 9 December 2021, the only goal of the game in a 1–0 UEFA Europa Conference League victory over the Danish side Randers.

On 31 January 2022, Oosting signed a contract with Willem II until the summer of 2026.

International
He was the starter for Netherlands national under-17 football team at the 2017 UEFA European Under-17 Championship, as Netherlands were eliminated by Germany in the quarterfinal.

Personal life
His father Joseph Oosting was also a professional football player and is now a coach.

References

External links
 Career stats - Voetbal International
 

2000 births
Living people
Dutch footballers
Netherlands youth international footballers
Association football midfielders
Jong AZ players
Willem II (football club) players
AZ Alkmaar players
Eredivisie players
Eerste Divisie players
Footballers from Emmen, Netherlands